Elly Pourasef is an Iranian-American audiologist. She is best known for being on NBC Bravo’s reality TV show, Married to Medicine: Houston series.

Background 
Pourasef moved to Houston, Texas while she was five with her parents and her younger sister, Pegah Pourasef where she grew up. She attended the University of Texas at Austin for a Bachelor's degree in Communication Sciences and Disorders, and for a Doctorate of Audiology degree.

In 2016, Pourasef appeared in Married to Medicine: Houston, an American reality television series which chronicles the lives of five women in the Houston medical community portraying herself as an audiologist seeing patients in her audiology clinic, Memorial Hearing. She also works as an event planner for the Persian community in Texas.

During the COVID-19 pandemic Pourasef began selling facemasks with clear shields around the mouth in order to help hearing impaired patients who make use of Lip reading to communicate.

Filmography

References

External links 
 

Audiologists
University of Texas at Austin alumni
Event planners
Living people
Year of birth missing (living people)
People from Houston
Iranian emigrants to the United States